Kwesi Wilson (death 10 February 2019)  also known as Willie Roy, Willy Roy, Willi Roy was a Ghanaian entertainment critic, a musician, songwriter, a multi-Instrumentalist and a sound engineer.

Career 
He is known for his work with Femi Kuti, King Sunny Adé, Sonny Okosun and Daddy Lumba and an Artiste and Repertoire Manager for Zylofon Media.

References 

2019 deaths
Year of birth missing
Place of birth missing
Place of death missing